Thomas Henry Bath, CBE (21 February 1875 – 6 November 1956) was an Australian politician, trade unionist, newspaper editor, writer, and cooperativist. A member of the Labor Party, he served as a Member of the Western Australian Legislative Assembly between 1902 and 1914 for the constituencies of Hannans, Brown Hill and Avon, and was also Minister for Education for a period of 79 days in 1905, and Leader of the Opposition between 1906 and 1910. In later life, Bath was involved in the establishment of the University of Western Australia, and also initiated several agricultural cooperatives.

Early life
Bath was born to Thomas Henry Richard Bath, a miner, and his wife Sarah Ann Bath (née Barrow), on 21 February 1875, at Hill End, New South Wales, a mining town in the Blue Mountains. He emigrated to the Western Australian Goldfields in 1896, and found work as a miner. The following year, after a brief sojourn in New South Wales, Bath was involved in founding the Amalgamated Workers' Association. In 1898, he was asked to head the local chapter of the Knights of Labor, a United-States-based labour organisation, which he represented at the 1899 trade union conference, held in Coolgardie. In September 1900, Bath, despite having no formal training in writing, became the first editor of the Westralian Worker, a socialist publication. In July of the following year, Bath gave way to Wallace Nelson.

Political career

After being appointed secretary of the Kalgoorlie and Boulder Trades and Labor Council, Bath was involved in various faction-fighting between trade unions.

Later life
Bath was a leading member of the Freemasons in Western Australia, and was involved in the foundation of Lodge Bonnie Doon, 839, S.C., in 1897, under the Scottish Rite. He was made a Commander of the Order of the British Empire in 1949, for "long service to the wheatgrowing industry of the state". He died at his home in Mount Lawley on 6 November 1956 from a heart attack resulting from coronary occlusion.

Legacy 
Bath Lane, one of the minor roads in the Ballarat CBD, was named after him.

References

|-

|-

|-

|-

|-

1875 births
1956 deaths
Alumni of Oriel College, Oxford
Australian farmers
Australian Labor Party members of the Parliament of Western Australia
Australian Methodists
Australian miners
Australian newspaper editors
Australian trade unionists
Australian cooperative organizers
Australian Freemasons
Leaders of the Opposition in Western Australia
Members of the Western Australian Legislative Assembly
People from the Blue Mountains (New South Wales)
Australian Commanders of the Order of the British Empire